Piero Colonna (23 May 1891 – 24 August 1939) was an Italian politician. He was the son of Prospero Colonna di Paliano, who was twice mayor of Rome. He was born in Rome, Kingdom of Italy. He was the 5th fascist governor of Rome from 1936 to 1939. He died in office.

References

1891 births
1939 deaths
20th-century Italian politicians
Mayors of Rome
Colonna family
Italian nobility